Papua New Guinea sent a team to compete at the  2008 Summer Olympics in Beijing, China. The country's participation, in part, was funded by a large "nationwide fun run" organised in early July, with expectations of 35,000 participating runners. Papua New Guinea was represented by a total of seven athletes.

Athletics

Men

Women

Key
Note–Ranks given for track events are within the athlete's heat only
Q = Qualified for the next round
q = Qualified for the next round as a fastest loser or, in field events, by position without achieving the qualifying target
NR = National record
N/A = Round not applicable for the event
Bye = Athlete not required to compete in round

Boxing

Papua New Guinea qualified one boxer for the Olympic boxing tournament. Jack Willie qualified in the light flyweight class at the Oceania Championships.

Swimming

Men

Women

Taekwondo

Weightlifting

See also
 Papua New Guinea at the 2008 Summer Paralympics

References

Nations at the 2008 Summer Olympics
2008
Olympics